Biobío or Bio-Bío (older form: Bío-Bío) may refer to any of the following:

 Biobío River, the second longest river in Chile and the former southern frontier of the Captaincy General of Chile

 Administrative divisions
 Biobío Region, eighth region of Chile (first level)
 Biobío Province, subdivision of the Bío-Bío Region (second level)
 Alto Biobío, commune of the Bio Bío Province (third level)

See also 
 Radio Bío-Bío, a Chilean radio station with a news-based output
 ST Bio Bio, an Argentinian tug